Glasgow is one of the eight electoral regions of the Scottish Parliament. Nine of the parliament's 73 first past the post constituencies are sub-divisions of the region and it elects seven of the 56 additional-member Members of the Scottish Parliament (MSPs). Thus it elects a total of 16 MSPs.

Constituencies and council areas

2011– 

As a result of the First Periodic Review of Scottish Parliament Boundaries the boundaries of the region and constituencies were redrawn for the 2011 Scottish Parliament election.

Eight of the constituencies are entirely within the Glasgow City council area. The Rutherglen constituency comprises the extreme north-western part of the South Lanarkshire council area which is part of the Greater Glasgow urban area. The South Lanarkshire area is otherwise divided between the Central Scotland and South of Scotland regions.

1999–2011 

In terms of first past the post constituencies the region included:

The constituencies were created with the names and boundaries of Westminster constituencies, as existing in 1999. Scottish Westminster constituencies were mostly replaced with new constituencies in 2005. Holyrood constituencies were unaltered.

Members of the Scottish Parliament

Constituency MSPs

Regional list MSPs
N.B. This table is for presentation purposes only

Election results

2021 Scottish Parliament election

The candidates for the region in the 2021 Scottish Parliament election are as follows:

Constituency results 
{| class=wikitable
!colspan=4 style=background-color:#f2f2f2|2021 Scottish Parliament election: Glasgow
|-
! colspan=2 style="width: 200px"|Constituency
! style="width: 150px"|Elected member
! style="width: 300px"|Result

2016 Scottish Parliament election

In the 2016 Scottish Parliament election the region elected MSPs as follows:
 9 Scottish National Party MSPs (constituency members)
 4 Labour MSPs (additional members)
 2 Conservative MSP (additional members)
 1 Green MSP (additional member)

Constituency results 
{| class=wikitable
!colspan=4 style=background-color:#f2f2f2|2016 Scottish Parliament election: Glasgow
|-
! colspan=2 style="width: 200px"|Constituency
! style="width: 150px"|Elected member
! style="width: 300px"|Result

Additional member results
{| class=wikitable
!colspan=8 style=background-color:#f2f2f2|2016 Scottish Parliament election: Glasgow
|-
! colspan="2" style="width: 150px"|Party
! Elected candidates
! style="width: 40px"|Seats
! style="width: 40px"|+/−
! style="width: 50px"|Votes
! style="width: 40px"|%
! style="width: 40px"|+/−%
|-

2011 Scottish Parliament election

In the 2011 Scottish Parliament election the region elected MSPs as follows:
 7 Scottish National Party MSPs (five constituency members and two additional members)
 7 Labour MSPs (four constituency members and three additional members)
 1 Conservative MSP (additional member)
 1 Green MSP (additional member)

Constituency results 
{| class=wikitable
!colspan=4 style=background-color:#f2f2f2|2011 Scottish Parliament election: Glasgow
|-
! colspan=2 style="width: 200px"|Constituency
! style="width: 150px"|Elected member
! style="width: 300px"|Result

Additional member results
{| class=wikitable
!colspan=8 style=background-color:#f2f2f2|2011 Scottish Parliament election: Glasgow
|-
! colspan="2" style="width: 150px"|Party
! Elected candidates
! style="width: 40px"|Seats
! style="width: 40px"|+/−
! style="width: 50px"|Votes
! style="width: 40px"|%
! style="width: 40px"|+/−%
|-

2007 Scottish Parliament election
In the 2007 Scottish Parliament election the region elected MSPs as follows:
 9 Labour MSPs (all constituency members)
 5 Scottish National Party MSPs (1 constituency member, 4 additional members)
 1 Conservative MSP (additional member)
 1 Liberal Democrat MSP (additional member)
 1 Scottish Green Party MSP (additional member)

Constituency results 
{| class=wikitable
!colspan=4 style=background-color:#f2f2f2|2007 Scottish Parliament election: Glasgow
|-
! colspan=2 style="width: 200px"|Constituency
! style="width: 150px"|Elected member
! style="width: 300px"|Result

Additional member results
{| class=wikitable
!colspan=8 style=background-color:#f2f2f2|2007 Scottish Parliament election: Glasgow
|-
! colspan="2" style="width: 150px"|Party
! Elected candidates
! style="width: 40px"|Seats
! style="width: 40px"|+/−
! style="width: 50px"|Votes
! style="width: 40px"|%
! style="width: 40px"|+/−%
|-

 
 

 
  

 

  

 
 

 
 

Changes:
 Anne McLaughlin replaced Bashir Ahmad. Ahmad died in February 2009 and McLaughlin was next on the Scottish National Party's list.

2003 Scottish Parliament election 
In the 2003 Scottish Parliament election the region elected MSPs as follows:

 10 Labour MSPs (all constituency members)
 2 Scottish National Party MSPs (both additional members)
 2 Scottish Socialist Party MSPs (both additional members)
 1 Conservative MSP (additional member)
 1 Liberal Democrat MSP (additional member)
 1 Scottish Green Party MSP (additional member)

Constituency results 
{| class=wikitable
!colspan=4 style=background-color:#f2f2f2|2003 Scottish Parliament election: Glasgow
|-
! colspan=2 style="width: 200px"|Constituency
! style="width: 150px"|Elected member
! style="width: 300px"|Result
 
 
 
 
 
 
 
 
 
 

Changes:
 On 1 September 2005, Mike Watson resigned after pleading guilty to fire-raising. At the subsequent Glasgow Cathcart by-election held 29 September 2005, Charlie Gordon held the seat for Labour.

Additional member results 
{| class=wikitable
!colspan=8 style=background-color:#f2f2f2|2003 Scottish Parliament election: Glasgow
|-
! colspan="2" style="width: 150px"|Party
! Elected candidates
! style="width: 40px"|Seats
! style="width: 40px"|+/−
! style="width: 50px"|Votes
! style="width: 40px"|%
! style="width: 40px"|+/−%
|-
 
 
 
 
 
 
 
 
 
  
 
  
 
 

Changes:
Tommy Sheridan resigned from the Scottish Socialist Party in September 2006 and sat as a member of Solidarity.

1999 Scottish Parliament election 
In the 1999 Scottish Parliament election the region elected MSPs as follows:

 10 Labour MSPs (all constituency members)
 4 Scottish National Party MSPs (all additional members)
 1 Conservative MSP (additional member)
 1 Liberal Democrat MSP (additional member)
 1 Scottish Socialist Party MSP (additional member)

Constituency results 
{| class=wikitable
!colspan=4 style=background-color:#f2f2f2|1999 Scottish Parliament election: Glasgow
|-
! colspan=2 style="width: 200px"|Constituency
! style="width: 150px"|Elected member
! style="width: 300px"|Result
 
 
 
 
 
 
 
 
 
 

Changes:
 On 11 October 2000, Donald Dewar died. At the subsequent Glasgow Anniesland by-election on 23 November 2000, Bill Butler held the seat for Labour.

Additional member results 
{| class=wikitable
!colspan=8 style=background-color:#f2f2f2|1999 Scottish Parliament election: Glasgow
|-
! colspan="2" style="width: 150px"|Party
! Elected candidates
! style="width: 40px"|Seats
! style="width: 40px"|+/−
! style="width: 50px"|Votes
! style="width: 40px"|%
! style="width: 40px"|+/−%
|-

Footnotes

Sources
Glasgow City Council

See also 
 Glasgow
 Politics of Glasgow
 South Lanarkshire
 Renfrewshire

Scottish Parliamentary regions
Politics of Glasgow
Scottish Parliament constituencies and regions 1999–2011
Scottish Parliament constituencies and regions from 2011
Politics of South Lanarkshire